Harriet Riddell (born 1990) is a performance textile artist and educator from Oxfordshire who uses freeform embroidery to create stitched portraits and live scenarios. Often stitching in challenging locations such as public markets, slums and fields, she has used solar energy, bicycle-powered batteries, and foot pedals to power her sewing machine. Riddell has exhibited her work around the world including in London, Delhi, Nairobi and Toronto.

Riddell initially learned to use a sewing machine as a young child from her mother. Riddell's grandmother, a Canadian textile artist, taught her freeform embroidery when Riddell was ten years old.

References

Living people
21st-century British women artists
Alumni of the University of Hertfordshire
People from Oxfordshire
British textile artists
British performance artists
21st-century textile artists
Women textile artists
Women performance artists
1990 births
British embroiderers